Evelyn Dall (born Evelyn Mildred Fuss; January 8, 1918 – March 10, 2010) was an American singer and actress.

Career
Born in The Bronx, New York City, as Evelyn Mildred Fuss, she took her stage name from the surname of two grandchildren of President Franklin D Roosevelt. Dall began her career in short films and in supporting roles on Broadway. In 1935, she was invited to become the female vocalist for Bert Ambrose and his Orchestra, in the UK, where she remained until 1946. She was known there as Britain's "Original Blonde Bombshell".

In 1946, she returned to the United States where she married and raised a daughter and son. Widowed in 1974, Dall moved to Jupiter, Florida, in 1980, then to Arizona in 2002.

Musical films
1936 Soft Lights and Sweet Music
1937 Calling All Stars
1937 Sing as You Swing
1938 Kicking the Moon Around
1941 He Found a Star
1942 King Arthur Was a Gentleman
1943 Miss London Ltd.
1944 Time Flies

Theater musicals
1935 Parade (Broadway)
1940 Present Arms (London)
1944 Something for the Boys (London)
1945 Follow the Girls (London) production

Death
After suffering a broken hip due to a fall in 2006, Dall moved to a nursing home to recuperate. The home was close to her daughter. In early 2007, Dall suffered a heart attack; she also had ongoing arthritis and dementia. 

She died on March 10, 2010, in Phoenix, Arizona, after an extended illness, aged 92. She was survived by her children.

References

External links

1918 births
2010 deaths
American expatriates in England
American women singers
American film actresses
American musical theatre actresses
American stage actresses
People from the Bronx
Actresses from Phoenix, Arizona
People from Jupiter, Florida
21st-century American women